Camberley  is a town in the Borough of Surrey Heath in Surrey, England,  approximately  south-west of Central London. The town is in the far west of the county, close to the borders of Hampshire and Berkshire. Once part of Windsor Forest, Camberley grew up around the Royal Military Academy Sandhurst and the associated Army Staff College. Known originally as "Cambridge Town", it was assigned its current name by the General Post Office in 1877.

Camberley's suburbs include Crawley Hill, York Town, Diamond Ridge, Heatherside and Old Dean.

The town is immediately north of the M3 motorway, which may be accessed via junction 4. Camberley railway station is on the line between Ascot and Aldershot; train services are run by South Western Railway.

History

Before the 19th century, the area now occupied by Camberley was referred to as Bagshot or Frimley Heath. An Iron Age fort, among many examples known as Caesar's Camp, was to the north of this area alongside the Roman road The Devil's Highway. The Intenarium Curiosum, published in 1724, describes a collection of Roman pottery around the area, and a further collection was discovered at Frimley Green in the late 20th century. In the Middle Ages, the area was part of Windsor Forest.

In the 17th century, the area along the turnpike road through Bagshot Heath (now the A30) was known as a haunt of highwaymen, such as William Davies – also known as the Golden Farmer – and Claude Duval. The land remained largely undeveloped and uncultivated due to a sandy topsoil making it unsuitable for farming. In A tour thro' the whole island of Great Britain, written between 1724 and 1726, Daniel Defoe described the area as barren and sterile; "a mark of the just resentment shew'd by Heaven upon the Englishmen's pride… horrid and frightful to look on, not only good for little, but good for nothing". A brick tower was built on top of The Knoll in the 1770s, by John Norris of Blackwater. It may have been used for communications but there is no firm evidence. The remains are now known as The Obelisk.

19th century
The town as it now stands has its roots in the building of The Royal Military College, which later became the Royal Military Academy, Sandhurst, in 1812. A settlement known as "New Town" grew in the area around the college which in 1831 was renamed Yorktown, after Prince Frederick, Duke of York and Albany. At this time, the population was 702. In 1848, the first parish church of St. Michael, Yorktown was built by Henry Woodyer, in an area formerly part of Frimley, itself only a chapelry of Ash.

Later, the Staff College was established to the east of the academy, and a property speculator built the nearby Cambridge Hotel. The surrounding area became known as Cambridge Town, but was renamed "Camberley" in January 1877 to avoid confusion by the General Post Office with Cambridge in Cambridgeshire. The name was actually derived from the "Cam" stream which runs through the town (mainly underground), "Amber" Hill which was marked on John Norden's map of the area in 1607 and "ley" usually meaning a clearing in the woodland.

During the 19th century, Camberley grew in size. This was given added impetus with the arrival of the branch-line railway and railway station in 1878 and a reputation for healthy air, due to the vast number of pine trees, which were said to be good for those suffering from pulmonary disorders. By the end of the century the population had reached 8,400. Since then, the town has absorbed the original settlement of Yorktown, which is now regarded as part of Camberley.

20th century
The Southern Scott Scramble, the first known motorcycle scrambling event, took place on Camberley Heath on 29 March 1924. The event, won by A.B. Sparks, attracted a crowd in the thousands and is considered to be the first instance of what later developed in the sport of motocross. During the Second World War, the Old Dean common was used as an instruction camp of the Free French Forces. The Kremer prize was conceived in the Cambridge Hotel in Camberley in 1959 after Henry Kremer toured a Microcell factory.

The defunct Barossa Golf Club, on Barossa Common, was founded in 1893 and continued until the Second World War.

The Old Dean housing estate was built in the 1950s on the "Old Dean Common" for residents of heavily bombed Surrey-area's homeless after World War II. Many of the roads on that half of the Old Dean are named after areas of London, with the others named after places on the common.

Camberley falls under the siren test area of Broadmoor Hospital, a secure mental hospital in nearby Crowthorne. The siren was installed following a public outcry at the escape of child-murderer John Thomas Straffen in April 1952. The siren, referred to as "Siren K", was tested every Monday at 10am, but was removed in late 2019.

In 1969 there was an outbreak of rabies when a dog, just released from a sixth month quarantine after returning from Germany, attacked two people on Camberley Common. The scare resulted in restriction orders for dogs and large-scale shoots to carry out the destruction of foxes and other wildlife.

21st century
After debate and delay (plans having been discussed for over half a decade), in 2006, a  mixed-use development west of Park Street named The Atrium was built of residential, leisure and retail buildings with wide pedestrianised areas and 683 public parking spaces. Its 217 mid-rise apartments split into courtyards in the Barcelona style. Fourteen new retail units face directly onto Park Street, opposite the Main Square shopping centre. Park Street has been pedestrianised and landscaped as part of the development. Leisure facilities include a nine-screen cinema, a bowling alley, a health and fitness club, cafés and restaurants. Various elements of The Atrium was opened during 2008, with the final elements, the main cinema and bowling alley, opening in October and November 2008, respectively.

In 2009, the town's households were named by Experian as having the highest carbon footprint in the UK, estimated at 28.05 tonnes per household per year (compared to 18.36 tonnes for the lowest, South Shields).

Geography
Camberley is in the far west of Surrey, adjacent to the boundaries of Hampshire's Hart district and Berkshire's Bracknell Forest district. It lies directly between the A30 national route and M3 motorway (junction 4 exit).

Frimley has its own town centre, a major regional hospital (Frimley Park) and extensive suburban areas. In the 19th century, York Town and Camberley were in the ecclesiastical parish of Frimley.

The town of Blackwater,  to the west is identified by the Government Statistical Service (including its ONS office) as within the Built-up-Area but is in the Hart District of Hampshire and has its own town council (both take in Hawley). The same could be said for Sandhurst which is home of "The Meadows" retail park which is in the Bracknell Forest borough of Berkshire. The Royal Military Academy Sandhurst is located in Camberley, despite the name suggesting otherwise.

Economy

Camberley's town centre is host to The Square shopping centre (previously called The Mall), controversially purchased by Surrey Heath Borough Council for £110 million in 2016. This is a late 1980s development anchored by rent free stores such as Sports Direct subsidiary House of Fraser. The High Street has a number of shops as well as bars and clubs, many of the latter being more recent additions. There are a number of secondary shopping streets including Park Street, Princess Way and parts of London Road, including the  "Atrium" development. Camberley's town centre is suffering a decline in footfall and increases in vacancies as shoppers in affluent areas move their spending online and towards leisure and experience activities as opposed to traditional retail.

Major employers include Siemens, which moved its UK headquarters to the area in 2007. Burlington Group who moved into Watchmoor Park in 2009 and Sun Microsystems, until they were taken over by Oracle in 2010, whose UK headquarters was located just across the Hampshire border in Minley next to the M3 motorway at junction 4a. Krispy Kreme UK are based in Albany Park, an industrial estate just outside Camberley in nearby Frimley.

Culture

The town has its own public library, museum, cinema and theatre and is home to the Surrey Heath Borough Council offices. The Vue cinema opened in The Atrium development in late 2008, the year after an older cinema, owned by Robin's Cinemas, and on London Road some distance from the town centre, burned down in 2007 after having closed in 2003.

Camberley and the Royal Military Academy Sandhurst are featured in a Doctor Who comic story entitled "The Warkeeper's Crown".

Camberley Theatre
The Camberly Theatre, is owned, subsidised and managed by Surrey Heath Borough Council. The arts venue/receiving house comprises a 408-seat auditorium, conference rooms, studio theatre and multi-media editing suite. The theatre programme comprises music concerts, contemporary and classical drama, comedy evenings, an annual professional pantomime and cinema films. The theatre is also used by local recreational actors, musicians, landscape artists and dance schools, advertising all tickets on its own website for productions.

Landmarks

A familiar landmark in Camberley is The Concrete Elephant, a concrete pipe white elephant which is on the A30 approaching The Meadows roundabout. This was created as advertising by a pipe company which rented the premises. When they closed down, the upkeep of the elephant was written into the tenancy contract, so subsequent businesses have continued to look after it.

The Jolly Farmer is a former pub at the junction of the A30 and A325 to the East of Town. It is named after Willam Davies, who was hanged at this location in 1689. The Wheatsheaf is a Grade II listed pub to the southeast of the town, designed in a distinctive ratchet-wheel design.

Transport

Railway
Camberley railway station is immediately south of the commercial centre on the Ascot to Guildford line, connected to Guildford, Aldershot in the south and Ascot to the north; there are two trains per hour in each direction.

Between the radial South West Main Line and Waterloo to Reading Line, capacity and stock constraints limit the direct services to and from London Waterloo to peak hours, running via Ascot and increasingly urban towns of Staines-upon-Thames, Twickenham then Richmond. In non-peak times, passengers from Camberley change at Ascot or Ash Vale for London. 
Long-distance stations (NE to SW)
A few miles south-west and connected also by bus, Farnborough station provides direct trains to Waterloo, Basingstoke, the medieval city of Winchester, the port of Southampton and, on a lower frequency, Portsmouth.
Long-distance stations (NW to SE)
Directly west, Blackwater station (close to the A30) on the North Downs Line is operated by Great Western Railway, with trains running to Reading, Guildford, Redhill and Gatwick Airport.

Buses
Bus companies operating routes through Camberley include: Thames Valley Buses to Bracknell; Arriva Guildford & West Surrey to Guildford via Woking; Stagecoach South to Aldershot and Farnborough; and White Bus to Ascot and Staines.

Roads
Camberley's northern parts such as College Town are astride the old south-west road (A30) and the whole settlement is between junctions 3 and 4 of the M3 motorway.

The A30 leaving Camberley to the north for Bagshot has a large junction called the Jolly Farmer Roundabout; it is named after the public house that stood on it. The pub was originally called The Golden Farmer, after a local farmer and highwayman, William Davis.

Aviation
There are two small airports nearby: Farnborough Airport at Farnborough and Blackbushe Airport. Farnborough Airport is well known for its International Air Show.

Education
There are a number of schools in Camberley. Collingwood College is one of the largest in Surrey with over 2,000 pupils. Kings International College (formerly France Hill School) is also in Camberley. Other schools include Lyndhurst School founded in 1895 and one of only a few day preparatory schools with an unbroken history of over one hundred years, Lyndhurst School Day Nursery, Tomlinscote School and Sixth Form College, Lakeside Primary School, Watchetts Junior School (This is outdated, the school was renamed a few years ago), Camberley Infant School, Crawley Ridge Junior School, Ravenscote Junior School, Bristow First Infants School, Lorraine Infant School and Nursery, Cordwalles Junior School, Heather Ridge Infants School (Heatherside).

Sport

Camberley has an active sports scene, mainly based around clubs and sports venues such as Places Leisure Camberley, a leisure centre and pool facility close to the town centre. Places Leisure replaced the former facilities known as "The Arena" in July 2021.

Camberley and Farnborough Hockey Club plays men's and women's field hockey at Kings International College and draws many players from the region. The Men's 1st XI have recently secured back to back promotions and currently play in the Hampshire/Surrey – Regional Division 2. The Ladies 1st XI play in Surrey Ladies Hockey League Division 6. The Club in total supports 5 men's teams, 3 women's teams, a mixed team and colts teams from Under 10's to Under 18's.

Camberley Town Football Club currently plays in the Premier division of the Combined Counties League. The home ground is at Krooner Park, Wilton Road. Camberley Rugby Football Club  plays in the London 2 South West in English level 7 Rugby Union League. The home ground is at the Watchetts recreation ground, Park Road.

Camberley Cricket Club  1st XI plays in the Surrey Championship Division 1. Formed in 1944 fixtures were initially played at the Royal Military Academy Sandhurst before moving to its current ground in Upper Verran Road. The club runs several teams on Saturday and Sundays and has a thriving junior section composed of both boys and girls.

Camberley Midweek Cricket League  is an after-work cricket league that has been running for over 60 years. Members include cricket teams from local companies, schools and government organisations from Camberley, Frimley and Farnborough.

Camberley Heath Golf Club, recently used as a location in the TV drama Killing Eve was designed by Harry Colt and founded in 1913.

Frimley Lawn Tennis Club offer social and competitive tennis. They play at the Watchetts recreation ground in Camberley. Men's, ladies and mixed teams play all year in the Aldershot and District LTA League.

Both Camberley Chess Club and Camberley Junior Chess Club meet every Tuesday at the Camberley Baptist Church Hall, Frimley Road, Camberley, GU15 3EN. They were 2007–8 Berkshire League champions. They also compete in several divisions of the Surrey Border League and are current holders of the Bell Trophy.

Farnborough & Camberley Cycling Club was formed by an amalgamation of the renowned Camberley Wheelers cycling club and Farnborough Cycling Club in 1969. The Camberley Wheelers had a history that went back to the 1920s or 30s. A current (June 2011) member of the FCCC joined the Camberley Wheelers in 1935. Camberley Kart Club was one of the first kart clubs in the UK started in 196 and behind Blackbushe airport and car auctions. TS Diadem (Camberley Sea Cadets) was founded in 1955 and recently moved to new premises in Gilbert Road, opened by the Earl of Wessex in January 2011.

Demography and housing

The average level of accommodation in the region composed of detached houses was 28%, the average that was apartments was 22.6%. The remaining households not accounted for above were temporary/caravans and shared households.

The proportion of households in the civil parish who owned their home outright compares to the regional average of 35.1%. The proportion who owned their home with a loan compares to the regional average of 32.5%. The remaining percentage is made up of rented dwellings (plus a negligible percentage of households living rent-free).

Religion
The 2011 census showed that 63.4% of Surrey Heath residents considered themselves Christian. Camberley has churches of several Christian denominations, mostly Anglican, many of which are members of a Churches Together group. The Catholic parish of Camberley and Bagshot includes St Tarcisius Church, Camberley (a Grade II listed building), St Peter and St John in Old Dean and Christ the King in Bagshot. There is also a Jehovah's Witness Kingdom Hall in the town.

A local Bengali Welfare Association has maintained an Islamic centre in Camberley since 1996. Plans to convert the former school building into a more traditional Mosque were subject to intense debate, resulting in the withdrawal of planning permission in early 2010.

Notable people

References
Notes

Citations

Sources

External links
 Surrey Heath Council – Camberley's Local Council

Camberley Life - Local information to people who live, work and visit Camberley Surrey

 
Surrey Heath
Towns in Surrey